Thomas Andrew may refer to:
Thomas Andrew (cricketer) (1843–1927), Scottish-born New Zealand cricketer
Thomas Andrew (photographer) (1855–1939), New Zealand photographer
Thomas Andrew (MP) (died 1517), English MP for Exeter
Thomas Andrew (choreographer) (1932–1984), né Edward Thomas Andrulewicz and a son of Teddy Andrulewicz

See also
Thomas Andrewe, poet

Thomas Andrews (disambiguation)